Damn the torpedoes may refer to:

 A quotation attributed to David Farragut, referring to an order given at the Battle of Mobile Bay
 Damn the Torpedoes (album), a 1979 album by Tom Petty & the Heartbreakers
 Damn the Torpedoes, a 1971 book by J. E. Macdonnell
 Damn the Torpedoes: Naval Incidents of the Civil War, a 1989 book by the son of Adolph A. Hoehling (homonym.)
 Damn the Torpedoes, a 1990 book by Paul Hellyer
 Damn the Torpedoes, a racing boat in the video game Hydro Thunder